Jei or JEI may refer to:
 Jamaat-e-Islami
 Jane Castro (born 1982), American entertainer
 Islamic Republic of Iran (Jomhuri-ye Eslāmi-ye Irān)
 Journal of Electronic Imaging
 Yei language, spoken in Papua New Guinea
 Jei, a character in Usagi Yogimbo
 Jei, member of South Korean girl group Fiestar
 JEI Corporation, a South Korean educational company